Sale is a surname. Notable people with the surname include:

Albert Sale (1850–1874), US Army soldier and Medal of Honor recipient
Charles "Chic" Sale (1885–1936), American vaudeville performer
Chris Sale (born 1989), American Major League Baseball pitcher
Dick Sale (1919–1987), English schoolmaster and cricketer
Florentia Sale (1790–1853), English writer
Forest Sale (1911–1985), American collegiate basketball player and politician
Freddy Sale (1902–1956), American baseball pitcher
George Sale (1697–1736), English orientalist and solicitor
George Sale (academic) (1831–1922), New Zealand newspaper editor, gold miner, public administrator and university professor
Jamie Salé (born 1977), Canadian pairs figure skater
John Sale (1758–1827), English singer
John Bernard Sale (1779–1856), English organist, son of John Sale
Kirkpatrick Sale (born 1937), American environmental and human ecology scholar and author
Mark Sale (born 1972), English former footballer
Ned Sale (1883–1918), New Zealand cricketer, father of Scott Sale
Niu Sale (born 1969), American football player
Richard Sale (director) (1911–1993), American screenwriter and film director
Robert Sale (1782–1845, British Army major general
Ted Sale (1871–1920), English cricketer
Tim Sale (artist) (born 1956), American comic book artist
Tim Sale (politician) (born 1942), Canadian politician
Tommy Sale (1910–1990), English footballer
Tommy Sale (rugby league) (1918–2016), English rugby league player
Tony Sale (1931–2011), English computer hardware engineer and historian of computing
Scott Sale (1915–1991), New Zealand cricketer, son of Ned Sale
Virginia Sale (1899–1992), American character actress